Alison Paterson may refer to:

 Alison Paterson (company director) (born 1935), New Zealand businesswoman
 Alison Paterson (rower) (born 1966), British rower